Osteosclerosis is a disorder that is characterized by abnormal hardening of bone and an elevation in bone density. It may predominantly affect the medullary portion and/or cortex of bone. Plain radiographs are a valuable tool for detecting and classifying osteosclerotic disorders. It can manifest in localized or generalized osteosclerosis. Localized osteosclerosis can be caused by Legg–Calvé–Perthes disease, sickle-cell disease and osteoarthritis among others. Osteosclerosis can be classified in accordance with the causative factor into acquired and hereditary.

Types

Acquired osteosclerosis
 Osteogenic bone metastasis caused by carcinoma of prostate and breast
 Paget's disease of bone
 Myelofibrosis (primary disorder or secondary to intoxication or malignancy)
 Osteosclerosing types of chronic osteomyelitis 
 Hypervitaminosis D 
 hyperparathyroidism
 Schnitzler syndrome
 Mastocytosis
Skeletal fluorosis
 Monoclonal IgM Kappa cryoglobulinemia
 Hepatitis C.

Hereditary osteosclerosis
 Malignant infantile osteopetrosis
 Neuropathic infantile osteopetrosis
 Infantile osteopetrosis with renal tubular acidosis
 Infantile osteopetrosis with immunodeficiency
 IO with leukocyte adhesion deficiency syndrome (LAD-III)
 Intermediate osteopetrosis
 Autosomal dominant osteopetrosis (Albers-Schonberg)
 Pyknodysostosis (osteopetrosis acro-osteolytica) 
 Osteopoikilosis (Buschke–Ollendorff syndrome)
 Osteopathia striata with cranial sclerosis
 Mixed sclerosing bone dysplasia
 Progressive diaphyseal dysplasia (Camurati–Engelmann disease)
 SOST-related sclerosing bone dysplasias

Diagnosis
Osteosclerosis can be detected with a simple radiography. There are white portions of the bone which appear due to the increased number of bone trabeculae.

Animals
In the animal kingdom, there also exists a non-pathological form of osteosclerosis, resulting in unusually solid bone structure with little to no marrow. It is often seen in aquatic vertebrates, especially those living in shallow waters, providing ballast as an adaptation for an aquatic lifestyle. It makes bones heavier, but also more fragile. In those animal groups, osteosclerosis often occurs together with bone thickening (pachyostosis). This joint occurrence is called pachyosteosclerosis.

See also
 Pachyostosis
 Pachyosteosclerosis
 Heinrich Albers-Schönberg

References

External links 

Osteopathies
Animal anatomy
Skeletal system